Esther Rofe (14 March 190426 February 2000) was an Australian musician and composer.

Biography
Esther Rofe was born in Australia. She studied piano and violin with Alberto Zelman, Jr., Fritz Hart and A.E. Floyd and appeared with the Melbourne Symphony Orchestra at age 13. She entered the Royal College of Music in London and studied with Gordon Jacob, Ralph Vaughan Williams and R.O. Morris.

During World War II Rofe worked at the Australian Broadcasting Commission (ABC), and the Colgate-Palmolive Radio Unit in Sydney where she began arranging and composing music. Rofe began composing for ballet in 1943. The Esther Rofe Songbook was published in Melbourne in December 1999.

Rofe and her sister Edith moved to Southport where Rofe lived and worked for twenty years by the sea. She never married, but fostered a child, Carden James Rofe. Carden had two sons - Hamer Rofe and Malcolm Rofe. She died in February 2000 and Hamer Rofe & his ex wife Cathy Rofe, Malcolm Rofe and his wife Christina Rofe scattered her ashes in the Lune River in Southport Bay. The Esther Rofe Award was established in her honor at the University of Melbourne in Australia.

Honors and awards
1993 Composer-of-Honour in the School of Music Conservatorium at Monash University.
1998 Australia Day Citizen of the Year award from the City of Boroondara
1998 Became a represented composer at the Australian Music Centre (AMC).

Works
Rofe was known for ballet. Selected works include:

Sea Legend (1943) ballet choreographed by Dorothy Stevenson
Terra Australis (1946) ballet choreographed by Edouard Borovansky
L’Amour enchantee (1950) ballet choreographed by Martyn
Mathinna (1954) ballet choreographed by Martyn
The Lake (1962) rework of L’Amour enchantee for television

References

1904 births
2000 deaths
20th-century Australian musicians
20th-century classical composers
Australian classical composers
Australian women classical composers
20th-century women composers
20th-century Australian women